Justice Randall may refer to:

Edwin M. Randall, chief justice of the Florida Supreme Court
Jonathan Randall (Rhode Island), associate justice of the Rhode Island Supreme Court
Samuel Randall (Rhode Island), associate justice of the Rhode Island Supreme Court